Esperança Machavela is a Mozambican jurist and politician.

Machavela was appointed as Minister of Justice by President Armando Guebuza on February 11, 2005, when Guebuza named his new government shortly after taking office.
Prior to her appointment, she had worked for the Ministry of Foreign Affairs and had served as an ambassador to Portugal.
She was removed from office (along with foreign minister Alcinda Abreu and transport minister Antonio Munguambe) on March 10, 2008, and was succeeded by Maria Benvida Levy, a former judge of the Maputo City Court.

References 

Living people
Year of birth missing (living people)
Ambassadors of Mozambique to Portugal
Mozambican jurists
FRELIMO politicians
Government ministers of Mozambique
Mozambican women diplomats
Female justice ministers
Women government ministers of Mozambique
21st-century Mozambican women politicians
21st-century Mozambican politicians
Women ambassadors